Making of  is a 2006 Tunisian film.

Synopsis
After failing sentimentally, with his family and at school, Bahta, a 25 years old breakdancer, feels down and, due to the Iraq war, reconsiders his clandestine escape. A rebel and disobedient by nature, the leader of a little breakdancer band, accomplishes many fearless deeds, provoking the police's anger. Wanted, he falls in with fundamentalists. The brainwashing process will not take place without mishaps.

Awards
 Cartago 2006
 FESPACO 2007
 Tetuán 2007
 TRIBECA 2007
 Taormina 2007
 Festival de New Delhi
 Festival de Orán
 FCAT 2008

External links
 

2006 films
Tunisian drama films